Jamestown is a unincorporated community in Smith County located in the U.S. state of Texas. The town was first settled in 1846. The town underwent rapid expansion and a post office was built. It was primarily focused on growing and shipping cotton. In 1861, Company G of the 14th Texas Voluntary Infantry of the Confederate States Army was raised in Jamestown. In 1903, the post office was moved to Overton, Texas The final business in Jamestown closed in 1964.

Notes

Unincorporated communities in Smith County, Texas
Unincorporated communities in Texas